The 1989–90 Magyar Kupa (English: Hungarian Cup) was the 50th season of Hungary's annual knock-out cup football competition.

Quarter-finals
Games were played on April 18 and April 25, 1990.

|}

Semi-finals
Games were played on May 9 and May 23, 1990.

|}

Final

See also
 1989–90 Nemzeti Bajnokság I

References

External links
 Official site 
 soccerway.com

1989–90 in Hungarian football
1989–90 domestic association football cups
1989-90